Dulwich Hill railway station is located on the Bankstown line, serving the Sydney suburb of Dulwich Hill. It is served by Sydney Trains T3 Bankstown line services.

History
Dulwich Hill station opened on 1 February 1895 as Wardell Road when the Bankstown line opened from Sydenham to Belmore. It was renamed Dulwich Hill on 1 July 1920.

To the north of the station, lie two tracks that are part of the Metropolitan Goods line. Opposite the platform lay a triangular junction that connected the Metropolitan Goods line to a branch to Rozelle. This was removed in October 2012 for the conversion of the Rozelle line to light rail.

The station has two platforms in an island platform configuration, the only station on the section running parallel to the goods line not to be converted to side platforms. The station buildings date from 1935.

Platforms & services

Transport links

Buses
Transit Systems operate one route via Dulwich Hill station:
412: Martin Place to Campsie station

Dulwich Hill station is served by one NightRide route:
N40: East Hills station to Town Hall station

Light Rail
The Inner West Light Rail terminates at the western end of Bedford Crescent, 100 metres from the railway station:
Inner West Light Rail: to Central via Leichhardt & Pyrmont

Future 
Dulwich Hill will be converted to a Metro station, as part of stage 2 of the Sydney Metro.  This will see the station upgraded with lift access, and a new concourse allowing a direct transfer to the Dulwich Hill light rail station.  The metro will also significantly increase the frequency of service to 15 trains an hour and shorten the trip to the city by up to 4 minutes.

References

Oakes, John. "Sydney's Forgotten Goods Railways" Australian Railway Historical Society 2001

External links

Dulwich Hill station details Transport for New South Wales
Dulwich Hill Metro station Sydney Metro

Railway stations in Sydney
Railway stations in Australia opened in 1895
Bankstown railway line
Inner West Council